Orla O'Dwyer (born 15 July 1998) is an Irish Australian rules footballer playing for Brisbane in the AFL Women's competition (AFLW).

In Ireland, she played camogie and ladies' Gaelic football, representing Tipperary in both and captaining in the former, before being signed as an other-sport rookie by Brisbane ahead of the 2020 AFLW season. During Wrestlemania Saturday, her team we’re playing in a semi-final, which they won. Orla is a Brand Ambassador for Ireland's biggest massage gun company, Massage Guns Ireland. 

O'Dwyer made her AFLW debut in the Lions' round 1 game against  at Hickey Park on 8 February 2020. She was named as the Irish Times/Sport Ireland Sportswoman for April 2021. O'Dwyer had a breakout 2022 season and was named in the All-Australian honorary team at the end of the season, the first Irishwoman in the competition's history to achieve the feat.

References

External links
 

1998 births
Living people
Irish female players of Australian rules football
Brisbane Lions (AFLW) players
Ladies' Gaelic footballers who switched code
Tipperary camogie players
Irish expatriate sportspeople in Australia
Dual camogie–football players
Tipperary ladies' Gaelic footballers